Collin Seedorf (born 1 May 1995) is a Dutch professional footballer who plays as a centre back for Eindhoven in the Eerste Divisie.

Club career

RKC Waalwijk
Seedorf made his professional debut in the Eerste Divisie for RKC Waalwijk on 24 November 2014 in a game against Jong PSV.

Inverness Caledonian Thistle
Seedorf signed for Scottish Championship club Inverness Caledonian Thistle on 5 July 2017. He received a red card in his second game of the season against Greenock Morton. He was then ruled out of the side due to a serious ankle injury which he sustained against Royal Signals F.C. in a mid-week bounce game at Fort George. At the end of the 2017–18 season, it was announced that Seedorf would be among the handful of players leaving the club due to a lack of funds following a significantly reduced parachute payment.

FC Eindhoven 
On 7 July 2018, Seedorf returned to Holland to sign for FC Eindhoven in the Eerste Divisie, the second highest tier in Dutch football. After spending the first half of the 2020–21 season with FC Emmen in the top tier Eredivisie (he did not make any appearances as he was recovering from an injury), he returned to FC Eindhoven on 1 February 2021.

Personal life
Born in the Netherlands, Seedorf is of Surinamese descent. He is the nephew of former Dutch international and four time Champions League winner, Clarence Seedorf.

Career statistics

Club

Honours
Inverness Caledonian Thistle
 Scottish Challenge Cup: 2017–18

References

External links
 

1995 births
Footballers from Amsterdam
Living people
Dutch footballers
Dutch sportspeople of Surinamese descent
Association football defenders
RKC Waalwijk players
Inverness Caledonian Thistle F.C. players
FC Eindhoven players
FC Emmen players
Eerste Divisie players
Scottish Professional Football League players
Dutch expatriate footballers
Expatriate footballers in Scotland
Dutch expatriate sportspeople in Scotland
Colin